Patrice Evans is an American writer and satirist, and author of Negropedia: The Assimilated Negro’s Crash Course on the Modern Black Experience. Evans also writes under the pen-name "The Assimilated Negro." He is currently a staff writer for Grantland.

Evans was born in the Bronx, New York. He went to prep schools Choate Rosemary Hall and Pomfret School, and attended Trinity College in Hartford, CT. He lives in New York City.

References

External links 
 The Assimilated Negro

21st-century American non-fiction writers
African-American bloggers
African-American non-fiction writers
American male bloggers
American bloggers
American satirists
Choate Rosemary Hall alumni
Living people
Pomfret School alumni
Trinity College (Connecticut) alumni
Writers from the Bronx
21st-century African-American writers
20th-century African-American people
1976 births